KSPW (96.5 FM) is a radio station broadcasting a Top 40 (CHR) format. Licensed to Sparta, Missouri, United States, it serves Springfield, Missouri.  The station is owned by SummitMedia.

Station history
KSPW debuted on the air on February 21, 1988, as KJLR. By July 1988, it adopted an adult contemporary format as KLTQ.  KLTQ changed to a hot country format on January 18, 1992. KLTQ subsequently switched to a soft rock format and then changed to a format referred to as "maximum country" in March 1996.  The station changed its call letters to KMXH in 1999. On March 23, 2001, KMXH switched to a rhythmic contemporary hits format. The station subsequently adopted the KSPW calls. The station patterned its rhythmic contemporary format after sister station KQCH/Omaha.

On August 29, 2012, Midwest Family Broadcasting Classic Hits “Star 92.9” KOSP dropped to a Rhythmic CHR “92.9 The Beat“. This put KSPW in direct competition with KOSP.

Journal Communications and the E. W. Scripps Company announced on July 30, 2014, that the two companies would merge to create a new broadcast company under the E.W. Scripps Company name that owned the two companies' broadcast properties, including KSPW. The transaction was completed in 2015, pending shareholder and regulatory approvals. Scripps exited radio in 2018; the Springfield stations went to SummitMedia in a four-market, $47 million deal completed on November 1, 2018.

DJs
Mornings: Fotsch and Sarah
Middays & Afternoons: The Ginge

References

External links

SPW
Contemporary hit radio stations in the United States
Radio stations established in 1988